The 2019 Canoe Slalom World Cup was a series of five races in several canoeing and kayaking categories organized by the International Canoe Federation (ICF). It was the 32nd edition.

Calendar 

The series opened with World Cup Race 1 in Lee Valley, England (13–16 June) and ended with the World Cup Final in Prague, Czech Republic (6–8 September).

Standings 
The winner of each race was awarded 60 points (double points were awarded for the World Cup Final). Points for lower places differed from one category to another. Every participant was guaranteed at least 2 points for participation and 5 points for qualifying for the semifinal run.

Points 
World Cup points were awarded on the results of each race at each event as follows:

Results

World Cup Race 1 

14–16 June in Lee Valley, England.

World Cup Race 2 

21–23 June in Bratislava, Slovakia.

World Cup Race 3 

28-30 June in Tacen, Slovenia.

World Cup Race 4 

30 August – 1 September in Markkleeberg, Germany.

World Cup Final 

6-8 September in Prague, Czech Republic. These were the World Championships for the extreme kayak events.

References

External links 
 International Canoe Federation

Canoe Slalom World Cup
Canoe Slalom World Cup